William Corey Duffel (born April 11, 1984) known as Corey Duffel, is a professional skateboarder from Walnut Creek, California.

Duffel's sponsors include Converse, Venture Trucks, Mob Grip, Orbs Wheels, Metro Skateboard Shop, Armourdillo, CCS magazine, Skullcandy headphones, and Bones Swiss Bearings.

Fashion and skating style 
Corey  is well known for dressing in a distinctive 1970s punk fashion.

He is known for his fast pace, performing tricks on big gaps, rails, stairs, big wallrides and other large obstacles (for example, the freeway gap in Foundation Skateboard's 2007 "Cataclysmic Abyss" video). His skating stance is Goofy. Duffel rides for his original sponsor, Metro, in his hometown.

Duffel began skateboarding at age ten, and turned pro at age eighteen.

Charity work 
Duffel works with mentor Michael Davis' Music Is Revolution Foundation, raising money to support music education in public schools. Davis and Duffel collaborated on fashion and skate items for Foundation.

Video appearances

 1998 Think - Dedication
 2001 Thrasher - Go For Broke
 2002 Thrasher - Playing in Traffic
 2002 Foundation - Madness & Mayhem.........skate till death
 2002 411VM - Issue #54 (Controlled Chaos Section)
 2002 411VM - Issue #55 (Wheels Of Fortune Section)
 2002 Zero Skateboards - Dying to Live (Friends Section)
 2003 Pharmacy Boardshop - Chily
 2004 Globe - World Cup Skateboarding Street Riot
 2004 Foundation - That’s Life Flick (Last Part)
 2004 Foundation - European Tour
 2005 Foundation - Gareth Stehr's Go Go Toe Jam
 2005 88 Footwear – Destroy Everything Now (Last Part)
 2006 411VM – Volume 14, Issue 1
 2006 Stephen Duffel – Beautiful Breakdown
 2007 Foundation - Cataclysmic Abyss (2nd Last Part)
 2007 X-Games - Street contest tyrant and is round
 2007 Osiris Footwear - Feed the Need (2nd Last Part)
 2007 Chandler tour
 2008 Congress oF Freaks Osiris
 2008 Skate And Create Transworld/Osiris [Congress Of Freaks The Sensation Of The Year]
 2009 Split Clothing - Demons in the Attic (Though the video was in fact produced and shipped, Split Clothing's untimely demise prevented this video from ever being seen, and Duffels footage has been unused)
 2009 BATB2 (Battle at The Berics2)
 2009 Transworld Skateboarding - Right Foot Forward (2nd Last Part)
 2009 Maloof Money Cup 2009
 2011 Foundation - WTF!
 2012 Osiris Footwear - Never Gets Old

Video game appearances
Duffel is a playable character in the 2010 video game Tony Hawk: Shred.

References

External links
 IK Store
 Skateboarding.com Interview
 Corey Duffel Forum
 List of Duffel's Skateboard video appearances
 Big Brother Interview
 Official Foskco Profile
 Official Pig Wheels Profile
 Official Sessions Profile
 Official HOVEN Skate Team Profile
 Official Osiris Shoes Profile

1984 births
Living people
American skateboarders
Sportspeople from Walnut Creek, California
Sportspeople from the San Francisco Bay Area